Abhinay is an Indian actor who has appeared in Malayalam and Tamil language films. He made his debut in the 2002 film, Thulluvadho Ilamai directed by Kasthuri Raja. He also appeared in advertisement of Oreo Biscuits, Crownply.

Career
Abhinay made his acting debut alongside Dhanush and Sherin in Kasthuri Raja's coming-of-age film Thulluvadho Ilamai (2002). The film's success prompted Abhinay to continue to appear in lead roles, and notably featured in Jjunction (2002), Singara Chennai (2004) and Pon Megalai (2005) as the protagonist.

In the late 2000s, he moved on to play supporting roles and notably featured in films including Solla Solla Inikkum (2009) and Palaivana Solai (2009) in pivotal characters.

He has since also worked in films as a dubbing artiste, providing the voice of Vidyut Jamwal in Thuppakki (2012) and Anjaan (2014).

Filmography

Films

Dubbing artist
Vidyut Jammwal (Thuppakki, Anjaan)
Milind Soman (Paiyaa)
Babu Antony (Kaaka Muttai)

References

Indian male film actors
Tamil male actors
Living people
1977 births